The Cajari River is a river of Amapá state in Brazil. It is a tributary of the Amazon River.

Course
The Cajari River drains the center of the  Rio Cajari Extractive Reserve, created in 1990.
The upper and middle course of the Cajari form flooded terraces. In the lower course the river merges with other water bodies, which form meanders, lakes and channels.

See also

List of rivers of Amapá

References

Sources

Rivers of Amapá
Tributaries of the Amazon River